Thomas Jack (5 February 1881 – 9 October 1961) was a British track and field athlete. He competed at the 1908 Summer Olympics.

References

1881 births
1961 deaths
Olympic athletes of Great Britain
Athletes (track and field) at the 1908 Summer Olympics
Scottish male marathon runners
Scottish male long-distance runners